Dimon S. Fanton (September 25, 1838 – May 2, 1882) was Warden of the Borough of Norwalk, Connecticut from 1856 to 1859. He also served on the town council of Weston from 1878 to 1882.

Associations 
Member, St. John Masonic Lodge Number 6.

References 

1838 births
1882 deaths
Farmers from Connecticut
American Freemasons
Mayors of Norwalk, Connecticut
People from Weston, Connecticut
19th-century American politicians